The men's single figure skating competition of the 2014 Winter Olympics was held at the Iceberg Skating Palace in Sochi, Russia. The short program was held on 13 February and the free skating was held on 14 February.

Records
For complete list of figure skating records, see list of highest scores in figure skating.

Prior to the competition, the existing ISU best scores were:

The following new best score was set during this competition:

Schedule
All dates and times are (UTC+4).

Results

Short program
The short program was held on 13 February.

Free skating
The free skating was held on 14 February.

Overall
The skaters were ranked according to their overall score.

TP - Total points; SP - Short program; FS - Free skating

Judges and officials
The officials for the event are:

See also
 Yuzuru Hanyu Olympic seasons
 List of career achievements by Yuzuru Hanyu

References

External links
 Sochi 2014 Figure Skating – Men's Singles page 
 Sochi 2014 Figure Skating Results Book
 2014 Winter Olympics page at the International Skating Union
 

Men's
Men's events at the 2014 Winter Olympics
2014 in figure skating